Vinyl is an American period drama television series created by Mick Jagger, Martin Scorsese, Rich Cohen and Terence Winter. The series stars Bobby Cannavale as Richie Finestra, a record executive in the 1970s. It premiered on HBO on February 14, 2016, and concluded on April 17, 2016.

From a teleplay by Winter and George Mastras, and story by Cohen, Jagger, Scorsese and Winter, the pilot episode was directed by Scorsese. The first season consisted of ten episodes. Scorsese had hoped to direct further episodes of the series.
Winter left his position as showrunner at the end of the first season due to creative differences, leaving the position to Scott Z. Burns.

HBO announced the renewal of Vinyl for a second season on February 18, 2016, soon after the pilot episode premiered. However, on June 22, 2016, HBO reversed that decision and cancelled the series. HBO head of programming Casey Bloys said of the decision, "It didn't land. With limited resources, we didn't think the retooling was worth the producers' time if it would only move the needle a little bit." In October 2018, Scorsese admitted to being heartbroken over the cancellation, describing the decision as "tragic", while also saying that in his opinion, the series would have had a better chance at succeeding if he had been more hands-on with his involvement and directed all episodes.

Premise 
The music scene in 1970s New York is still awash in sex and drugs, but rock 'n' roll is giving way to an era of punk, disco and hip-hop. Desperately trying to navigate the changing landscape is American Century Records founder and president Richie Finestra, whose passion for music and discovering talent has gone by the wayside. With his American Century Records on the verge of being sold, a life-altering event rekindles Finestra's professional fire, but it may leave his personal life in ruins.

Cast

Main
 Bobby Cannavale as Richie Finestra, a record executive trying to resurrect his label American Century.   
 Paul Ben-Victor as Maury Gold, a charming, avuncular record company owner.
 P. J. Byrne as Scott Leavitt, the head of legal for American Century.
 Max Casella as Julian "Julie" Silver, the head of A&R of American Century.
 Ato Essandoh as Lester Grimes, a former singer and Richie's ex-colleague.
 James Jagger as Kip Stevens, lead singer of Nasty Bits, a proto-punk band.
 J. C. MacKenzie as Skip Fontaine, head of sales for American Century.
 Jack Quaid as Clark Morelle, a young A&R executive at American Century.
 Ray Romano as Zak Yankovich, head of promotions for American Century.
 Birgitte Hjort Sørensen as Ingrid, a Danish actress favored by Andy Warhol and close friend of Devon.
 Juno Temple as Jamie Vine, an ambitious assistant at American Century's A&R Department.
 Olivia Wilde as Devon Finestra, Richie's wife and former actress/model who was once part of Warhol's Factory scene.

Recurring
 Susan Heyward as Cece, personal secretary to Richie at American Century.
 Emily Tremaine as Heather, receptionist of American Century.
 Ephraim Sykes as Marvin, A&R rep at American Century.
 MacKenzie Meehan as Penny, A&R rep at American Century.
 Griffin Newman as Casper, a mustachioed A&R rep at American Century.
 Jay Klaitz as Hal Underwood
 Annie Parisse as Andrea "Andie" Zito, Richie's former co-worker.
 John Cameron Mitchell as Andy Warhol
 Bo Dietl as Joe Corso, an "independent promotion man" with possible ties to organized crime.
 Lena Olin as Mrs. Fineman
 Jason Cottle as Detective Whorisky
 Armen Garo as Corrado Galasso
 Michael Drayer as Detective Renk
 Douglas Smith as Gary / Xavier

Historical figures 
Vinyl featured portrayals of a number of musicians, singers and other historical figures of the period, including:
 Christian Peslak as David Johansen, lead singer of New York Dolls
 Jonny D'Ambrosio as Johnny Thunders, guitarist of New York Dolls
 Zebedee Row as Robert Plant, lead singer of Led Zeppelin
 Ian Hart as Peter Grant, manager of Led Zeppelin
Vince Nudo as John Bonham, drummer of Led Zeppelin
 Kareem Bunton as Bo Diddley, musician, singer-songwriter, and rock and roll pioneer
 Connor Hanwick as Lou Reed, singer-songwriter and guitarist, and a former member of the Velvet Underground
Natalie Prass as Karen Carpenter, lead singer of the Carpenters
 Dominique Johnson as DJ Kool Herc, DJ and pioneer of hip hop music
Dustin Ingram as Alice Cooper, lead singer of Alice Cooper
 James Vincent Boland as Jeff Starship, musician and frontman of Sniper
 Matt Bogart as Robert Goulet, actor and traditional pop singer
 C.P. Lacey as Little Richard, pianist, singer-songwriter, and rock and roll pioneer
 Noah Bean as David Bowie, musician, singer-songwriter, and glam rock pioneer
 Wesley Tunison as Gram Parsons, musician, singer-songwriter, and country rock pioneer
 Shawn Klush as Elvis Presley, singer and rock and roll pioneer
 Gene Jones as Colonel Tom Parker, manager of Elvis Presley
 Leslie Kujo as Bob Marley, lead singer and lead guitarist of Bob Marley and the Wailers
 Stephen Sullivan as John Lennon, singer-songwriter and musician, and former member of the Beatles
 David Vadim as Hilly Kristal, owner of New York City club, CBGB
 Ben Mayne as Billy Name, Warhol collaborator and photographer

Episodes

Music 

The music for Vinyl was released by Atlantic Records & Warner Bros. Records. The first soundtrack album for the series, titled Vinyl (Music from the HBO® Original Series), Vol. 1, was released on February 12, 2016, two days before the show's premiere date. Three months prior, Icelandic rock band Kaleo released their song "No Good" on November 20, 2015, which was later featured in the second trailer for Vinyl, as well as on the show's Volume 1 & 1.6 soundtrack and EP respectively. After the release of Volume 1, Atlantic and Warner Bros. began featuring EPs for episode 2 to episode 9. Each one was made public on iTunes every week before the premiere of each episode, each featuring five songs.

All the songs featured on Volume 1, The EPs, and Vinyl: The Essentials (Best of Season 1) all consists of a mix of songs recorded from the period between the 1950s and 1970s, covers of songs by contemporary artists such as The Arcs, Julian Casablancas, Trey Songz, Chris Cornell, and Andrew W.K. and original songs written for the show to fit with the style of the period by artists such as Ty Taylor's "The World is Yours", Royal Blood's "Where Are You Now?" and Alex Newell's & DJ Cassidy's "Kill the Lights". Aside from the soundtrack music, the majority of the music featured on Vinyl consists of many genres, including rock, blues, pop, country, jazz, soul, funk, R&B, reggae, punk, disco and hip-hop.

Reception
Vinyl received mixed-to-positive reviews from critics. The acting (particularly Cannavale) and directing were generally praised, while the writing and storyline, particularly in the later half of the season, which many called "formulaic" and "familiar", were criticized.

On Rotten Tomatoes the first five episodes (which were given to critics in advance) holds an approval rating of 76%. The site's consensus reads: "Vinyl doesn't always keep the beat, dramatically speaking, but overall, it capably honors the rock pioneers of the '70s with absorbing stories, a spot-on soundtrack, and rich period detail." On another review aggregator, Metacritic, the first five episodes holds a score of 71 out of 100. But as the series progressed, reviews got significantly more critical.

Alan Sepinwall of HitFix gave the first season a B, writing that "there's an awful lot of excess in Vinyl, which perhaps makes sense for a show involving two icons of '70s rock in Jagger and Scorsese. But all of Richie's searching for the next idea, and all of the scenes involving the Nasty Bits or other rising forms of music, suggest a show that really wishes it could strip away all the glam and all the tropes and just do something simple and raw and powerful." Robert Bianco of USA Today wrote that "what follows is a sometimes humorous, sometimes nostalgic, sometimes bumpy ride through the era, with a story that often seems to halt just when it's picking up momentum. Still, every time the story falters, the characters' and the show's obvious love for popular music in all its forms lifts it back up."

On the other hand, Emily Nussbaum of The New Yorker had a mixed response, writing that "the show improves slightly after the jankily paced pilot, but it never sheds its air of leaden nostalgia." Verne Gay of Newsday reacted negatively, writing that the show "is a compelling idea in search of a compelling story. There simply isn't much of one, in fact, and--abhorring the ever-present vacuum--a lot of other elements rush in to fill the void. Scenes are padded, lots of flashbacks are even more flaccid, while actors devour the helpless scenery."

The show was nominated for two Emmy Awards: one for Outstanding Makeup for a Single-Camera Series (Non-Prosthetic) and the other for Main Title Design.

Cancellation
Vinyls renewal for a second season was announced on February 18, 2016 by HBO's programming president Michael Lombardo. However, HBO announced on June 22, 2016 that they had decided not to proceed with a second season.

Distribution

International broadcast
In Canada, the series premiered on HBO Canada on February 14, 2016, airing simultaneous with the American broadcast. In the UK, the series premiered on Sky Atlantic on February 15, 2016, airing at 2:00 a.m. initially to simulcast the U.S. premiere and then again at 9:00 p.m. the same day. The Australian premiere aired on Showcase on February 15, 2016. On HBO Asia, the series premiered on February 16, 2016. In New Zealand it premiered on February 15, 2016 on SoHo on Sky TV.

Home media
The first and only season of Vinyl was released on DVD and Blu-ray on June 7, 2016, by HBO Home Entertainment.

References

External links
 
 
 Opening credits on YouTube
 Official soundtrack playlist
 The Nasty Bits song "Woman Like You" audio only video

2010s American drama television series
2010s American music television series
2016 American television series debuts
2016 American television series endings
English-language television shows
HBO original programming
Television shows set in New York City
Television series set in the 1970s
Television series by Warner Bros. Television Studios
Television series by Paramount Television
Works about the music industry